Mohammed Dawood Yaseen (born 22 November 2000), is an Iraqi footballer who plays as a forward. He  plays for Al-Shorta SC in the Iraqi Premier League and for the Iraq national team

Club career
Dawood began his youth career at his native Al-Oloom wal-Technologia. He moved to Al-Khutoot and then joined Al-Naft SC in summer 2016, He scored his first league goal for Al-Naft in February 2017 against Al-Hussein SC in the Iraqi Premier League, He scored another 8 goals in his debut season, and assisted so many others. In season 2017–2018, he was the team's top scorer 18 goals, he was predominantly playing left winger.

International career

Iraq U-17 
Dawood was first called up to Iraq national under-17 team squad for the 2016 AFC U-16 Championship, on 16 September 2016 he played against South Korea and helped Iraq claim a first ever AFC U-16 Championship before the striker picked up the tournament's Most Valuable Player and Top Scorer awards.

International goals
Scores and results list Iraq's goal tally first.

Style of play 
Described as “ a very good player and studies the opponents very well,” added coach Chathir. “He is very talented and can play on the left and right side”, was featured in The Guardian's list of the 60 best young talents in world football 2017.

Honours

Club 
Al-Shorta
Iraqi Premier League: 2021–22
Iraqi Super Cup: 2022

International
Iraq U-17
 2016 AFC U-16 Championship

Individual
 2016 AFC U-16 Championship: MVP 
 2016 AFC U-16 Championship: Top Scorer

References

External links
 
 

2000 births
Living people
Association football forwards
Sportspeople from Baghdad
Al-Naft SC players
Al-Shorta SC players
Iraqi footballers
Iraq international footballers
2019 AFC Asian Cup players